Selliamedu is one of the 3 Firkas of Bahour taluk in Pondicherry (North) Revenue Sub-division of the Indian union territory of Puducherry.

Revenue villages
The following are the revenue villages under Selliamedu Firka

 Aranganoor
 Kirumampakkam
 Manapet
 Pillayarkuppam
 Selliamedu
 Utchimedu

See also
Bahour firka
Netapakkam firka

References

External links
 Department of Revenue and Disaster Management, Government of Puducherry

Geography of Puducherry
Puducherry district